is a Fukui Railway Fukubu Line station located in the city of Fukui, Fukui, Japan.

Lines

Station layout
The station consists of two ground-level opposed side platforms connected by a level crossing. There is no station building, but rather two raised platforms in the median of Phoenix-dōri (Prefectural Route 30) from which customers board and disembark.

Adjacent stations

History
On March 27, 2016: Kōenguchi Station renamed to Asuwayama-Koenguchi Station; promoted to an express train stop.

Surrounding area
 The Asuwa River lies to the north, Mount Asuwa to the west — both are popular urban oases. Lining the banks of the Asuwa River are 600 cherry blossom trees stretching 2.2 kilometers. Mount Asuwa is home to several parks, including a small zoo and athletic fields.
 Offices, shops, and homes are clustered around the station.
 Other points of interest include:
 Fukui Keya Post Office
 Fukui Municipal Natural History Museum
 Akemi Tachibana Literature Memorial Museum
 Fukui City Atagozaka Tea Ceremony Museum
 Fukui City Water Museum
 Emori Shōji company headquarters
 Sanai Park

See also
 List of railway stations in Japan

References

External links

  

Railway stations in Fukui Prefecture
Railway stations in Japan opened in 1933
Fukui Railway Fukubu Line
Fukui (city)